Campo de Marte Airport  is the first airport built in São Paulo, Brazil, opened in 1929. It is named after Champ de Mars, in Paris, which in turn got its name from Campus Martius, in Rome.

During a transitional period, the airport is jointly operated by Infraero and XP Inc.

History

Campo de Marte was the first airport built in São Paulo, officially opened on July 26, 1929.

The airport was bombarded during the 1932 Constitutionalist Revolution.

On 12 November 1933 a ceremony marking the start-up of scheduled flights of VASP took place at the airport. The first two routes linked Campo de Marte to São Carlos and São José do Rio Preto, and to Ribeirão Preto and Uberaba.

It handled all air operations in São Paulo until VASP opened Congonhas Airport in 1936. VASP considered it a necessary move because of unexpected growing demands, and to avoid a problem of constant flooding by the adjoining Tietê River, particularly the one that happened in 1929.

São Paulo Air Force Base was created on 22 May 1941 by Decree 3,302 at Campo de Marte Airport. On 26 January 1945 the base at Campo de Marte was decommissioned and transferred to its present location, then called Cumbica Farm at Guarulhos.

Presently it houses the São Paulo Flying School, founded in 1931, helicopters and general aviation services. It has limited night operations capability, usually reserved to helicopters.

The 4th command of the Brazilian Air Force is also located on the premises.

On 11 May 2007, Pope Benedict XVI canonized the first Brazilian-born saint, Frei Galvão, during a mass on the site.

Previously operated by Infraero, on August 18, 2022 XP Inc. won a 30-year concession to operate the airport.

Airlines and destinations

Accidents and incidents
4 November 2007: an Air Taxi Learjet 35A registration PT-OVC crashed over a house in a residential area nearby after a failed takeoff attempt from Campo de Marte, killing the pilot, co-pilot, and 6 people on the ground.
19 March 2016: a private kit aircraft, model Comp Air 9 registration PR-ZRA crashed into one house in the neighborhood of Casa Verde, about one mile after takeoff, killing 7 people on board and injuring one resident. Among the victims were entrepreneur Roger Agnelli and his family.

Access

See also

List of airports in Brazil

References

External links

Airports in São Paulo (state)
Airports in São Paulo
 
Airports established in 1929
1929 establishments in Brazil